The Zero Gravity Windstar is a South Korean single-place paraglider that was designed by Mansoo Chae and produced by Zero Gravity Paragliders of Seoul, introduced in 2002. It is now out of production.

Design and development
The Windstar was designed as an intermediate glider. The models are each named for their relative size.

By 2003 glider was initially to be only sold in South Korea, with global marketing to follow.

Variants
Windstar XS
Extra small-sized model for lighter pilots. In 2003 the glider model was undergoing certification.
Windstar S
Small-sized model for lighter pilots. In 2003 the glider model was undergoing certification.
Windstar M
Mid-sized model for medium-weight pilots. In 2003 the glider model was undergoing certification.
Windstar L
Large-sized model for heavier pilots. In 2003 the glider model was undergoing certification.

Specifications (Windstar M)

See also
Zero Gravity Flow

References

Windstar
Paragliders